Osment is a surname of Anglo-Saxon English origin, a variant of Osmond. Notable people with the surname include: 

 Emily Osment (born 1992), American actress and singer-songwriter
 Haley Joel Osment (born 1988), American actor
 Matthew Osment, New Zealand drummer